"Forgotten Years" is a song by Australian rock band Midnight Oil, released in April 1990 as the second single from their seventh studio album, Blue Sky Mining (1990). The song peaked at  26 on the Australian Singles Chart, No. 1 on the US Billboard Modern Rock Chart and No. 11 on the Billboard Album Rock Chart.

The song was inspired by drummer Rob Hirst's grandfather and father's experience of war and how they said it was up to future generations to avoid wars in the future and not to forget how horrible wars are. The music video was filmed in Douaumont Ossuary, France.

Track listings

Charts

See also
 List of Billboard number-one alternative singles of the 1990s

References

1989 songs
1990 singles
CBS Records singles
Midnight Oil songs
Songs written by Rob Hirst
Songs written by Jim Moginie